A television producer is a person who oversees one or more aspects of video production on a television program. Some producers take more of an executive role, in that they conceive new programs and pitch them to the television networks, but upon acceptance they focus on business matters, such as budgets and contracts. Other producers are more involved with the day-to-day workings, participating in activities such as screenwriting, set design, casting, and directing.

There are a variety of different producers on a television show. A traditional producer is one who manages a show's budget and maintains a schedule, but this is no longer the case in modern television.

Types of television producers

Different types of producers in the industry today include (in order of seniority):

Showrunner 

 The showrunner is the "chief executive" in charge of everything related to the production of the show. It is the highest-ranking individual who is responsible for the production and daily management of the show. In fictional television, they manage the writers room as well.

Executive producer 

 Established show creators with prior writing credits are often given the title of executive producer, even after they depart the show. Executive producers can be the showrunner/head writer, the head of a production company, or a long-time writer for the show.

Co-executive producer 

 Near seniority to the executive producers, these producers serve as "chief operating officers" by managing above and below-the-line staff. In fictional shows, they have also contributed significantly in the writing room, through table reads, discussions, and/or revisions. The co-executive producer may write scripts as well.

Supervising producer 

 In fictional shows, these producers assist in the creative process by engaging in table discussions, aiding in script rewrites, and also guiding new writers. In reality shows, they are often series directors who supervise other directors.

Producer 

 In fictional shows, a producer may not have written the episode, but contributed significantly through table reads, discussions, and/or revisions. They may also be a former executive producer who still writes for the show, but has since relinquished their duties as an executive producer. Producers responsible for production facilities and logistics receive the credit "produced by."

Co-producer 

 In fictional shows, a co-producer may not have written the episode, but contributed significantly through table reads, discussions, and/or revisions.

Coordinating producer 

 The term is only used when the staff are working simultaneously on multiple shows. In such scenario, this producer coordinates their various tasks for them and places them into teams.

Content of producer, producer of the content 
 As a content producer, you will have the opportunity to participate in the production of a constantly changing show: such as a television or radio program with a creative team who has the desire to do things differently.

Consulting producer, executive consultant, or production consultant 

 They consult certain aspects for the series. These producers are sometimes former executive producers or directors, who no longer work on the show, but are hired to consult for the production, nonetheless. They are usually called upon to assist the writers.

 Many television series that have a large in-house writing staff will usually have a few writers given the title of consulting producer, despite their day-to-day presence being no different from that of any other writer on staff. In these cases, the deal made with that writer does not meet the rules required to give them one of the titles from co-producer to executive producer. Examples include the writer not being required to be in-office five days a week, the writer's services being non-exclusive, or the writer's pay quote being too high for the responsibilities a more defined producer title might entail. Consulting producers like these are still assigned script drafts to write along with the rest of the series writing staff.

Associate producer 

 Performs various tasks and duties; Serves any of the producer job functions at the request of the showrunner.

Assistant producer 

 Sources contributors and stories for the reality program.

Chase producer 

 For news and talk show production, locates and schedules (or "chases") guests for interviews.

Segment producer 

 Writes one segment of a reality program.

Line producer 

 In charge of the unit production manager, line producers find staff to employ and oversee budgeting and scheduling. Most line producers receive the "produced by" title since they tend to also be responsible for production logistics.

Field producer 

 In reality shows only. Selects areas to film (outside of a television studio) and coordinates stories for a production in the field. They also form a trusting relationship with the cast/participants in order to get interviews while in the field. They may fill a number of different roles, including production manager/coordinator, videographer, and also production assistant.

Edit producer/Story producer

 Helps co-ordinate the edit by working with the editor and relaying information from other producers. Involved in creating stories and writing the script if necessary. In reality shows, the are often called a story producer.

Post-production producer or post-production coordinator 

 Responsible for the overall post-production process, including editing, dubbing, and grading, and are managed by the post-production supervisor.

In live television or "as-live", an executive producer seldom has any operational control of the show. their job is to stand back from the operational aspects and judge the show as an ordinary viewer might.

In film or video productions, the executive producer is almost always given an opportunity to comment on a rough cut, but the amount of attention paid to their comments is highly dependent on the overall personnel structure of the production.

Writer as "producer"
Because of the restrictions the Writers Guild of America screenwriting credit system places on writing credits, many script writers in television are credited as "producers" instead, even though they may not engage in the responsibilities generally associated with that title. On-screen, a "producer" credit for a TV series will generally be given to each member of the writing staff who made a demonstrable contribution to the final script.  The actual producer of the show (in the traditional sense) is listed under the credit "produced by".

Bill Lawrence, a television screenwriter, producer, director and series creator (Scrubs, Cougar Town and Spin City) explained during an interview on Off Camera that:

Star as "producer"
Sometimes the star of a successful television series can have a degree of influence over the creative process. For example, besides his leading role as Jack Bauer in 24, Kiefer Sutherland was credited as producer during the show's second season, then rising to co-executive producer from season 3 to the last few episodes of season 5, from where he was finally promoted to executive producer. Claire Danes, the star of Homeland, also produces the show. Mark Harmon, star of the series NCIS, serves as one of the show's producers. Similarly, Tom Welling, the star of the CW show Smallville, became co-executive producer for the show in season 9 and executive producer in season 10. House star Hugh Laurie became co-executive producer for the show in its sixth season. Holly Marie Combs and Alyssa Milano, the stars of Charmed, became producers of the show in its fifth season. Ellen Pompeo on Grey's Anatomy became a producer in season 14.

Notable television producers

 J. J. Abrams: Alias, Lost, Fringe, Person of Interest
 Mara Brock Akil: The Game, Girlfriends
 David Angell: Frasier, Wings, Cheers
 Desi Arnaz: I Love Lucy (1952–1956), Those Whiting Girls, The Lucy-Desi Comedy Hour (1957–1960), The Fountain of Youth, The Texan, The Ann Sothern Show (1958–1961), New Comedy Showcase, The Untouchables (1961–1962), The Lucy Show (1962-1963), The Mothers-In-Law (1967–1969), Land's End
 Nick Bakay: Sabrina the Teenage Witch, The King of Queens, 'Til Death, Two and a Half Men, Mom, The Kominsky Method
 Alan Ball: Six Feet Under, True Blood
 Chuck Barris: The Dating Game, The Gong Show, The Newlywed Game, Treasure Hunt
 Biddy Baxter: Blue Peter (1962–65; editor 1965–1988)
 Thom Beers: Deadliest Catch, Lobster Wars, numerous other Discovery Channel series
 Bradley Bell: The Bold and the Beautiful (1995–present) 
 William J. Bell: The Young and the Restless (1973-2005), The Bold and the Beautiful (1987-1995) 
 Donald P. Bellisario: Magnum, P.I.,  Airwolf, JAG, NCIS, Quantum Leap
 David Benioff: Game of Thrones
 Rick Berman: Star Trek: The Next Generation, Star Trek: Deep Space Nine, Star Trek: Voyager, Star Trek: Enterprise
 Eric Bischoff: WCW Monday Nitro
 Linda Bloodworth-Thomason: Designing Women, Evening Shade, Hearts Afire
 Andy Bobrow: Community, Malcolm in the Middle
 Steven Bochco: Hill Street Blues, L.A. Law, NYPD Blue
 Yvette Lee Bowser: Living Single, For Your Love, Half & Half
 Kevin S. Bright: Friends, Veronica's Closet, Jesse, Joey
 James L. Brooks: The Mary Tyler Moore Show, Rhoda, Taxi, The Simpsons, The Tracey Ullman Show, Lou Grant''', 
 Jerry Bruckheimer: The Amazing Race, Cold Case, CSI: Crime Scene Investigation, CSI: Cyber, CSI: Miami, CSI: NY, Without a Trace Mark Burnett: The Apprentice, Survivor, Rock Star, Are You Smarter than a 5th Grader?, The Contender, The Voice, Beat Shazam, The World's Best Stephen J. Cannell: The Rockford Files, The Greatest American Hero, 21 Jump Street, The A-Team, Hardcastle and McCormick, Hunter, Riptide, Stingray, Wiseguy, Renegade, Silk Stalkings, The Commish Marcy Carsey: 3rd Rock from the Sun, A Different World, The Cosby Show, Cosby, Roseanne, Cybill Chris Carter: The X-Files, Millennium, Harsh Realm, The Lone Gunmen Shaun Cassidy: American Gothic, Invasion, Ruby & The Rockits Ilene Chaiken: The L Word David Chase: The Sopranos Marc Cherry: Desperate Housewives, The Golden Girls Stephen Colbert: Strangers with Candy, The Colbert Report Betty Corday: Days of Our Lives (1966-1987)
 Ken Corday: Days of Our Lives (1985–present)
 Ted Corday: Days of Our Lives (1965-1966)
 David Cormican: Between, Shadowhunters, The Secret Life of Marilyn Monroe Simon Cowell: The X Factor, Britain's Got Talent, America's Got Talent Ron Cowen: Queer as Folk USA David Crane: Dream On, Friends, Veronica's Closet, Jesse, The Class, Episodes Carlton Cuse: The Adventures of Brisco County, Jr., Nash Bridges, Lost, Bates Motel, The Strain Greg Daniels: The Office, King of the Hill, The Simpsons Mike Darnell: 500 Questions, The World's Best, Mental Samurai Larry David: Seinfeld, Curb Your Enthusiasm Michael Davies: Who Wants to Be a Millionaire (1999-2010)
 Russell T Davies: Queer as Folk UK, Doctor Who (2005 revival), Torchwood and The Sarah Jane Adventures Frederick de Cordova: The Tonight Show Starring Johnny Carson (1970-1992)
 John de Mol: Big Brother, Fear Factor, Deal or No Deal Suzanne de Passe: Lonesome Dove, Sister, Sister, Smart Guy Roger Dobkowitz: The Price Is Right (1984–2008)
 David Doyle: Poker Superstars Invitational Tournament, Puppy Bowl Tina Fey: 30 Rock, Unbreakable Kimmy Schmidt Jeff Franklin: Full House, Hangin' with Mr. Cooper Lowell Ganz: Happy Days, Laverne & Shirley, Joanie Loves Chachi Larry Gelbart: M*A*S*H, AfterMASH Michael Gill: Civilisation, Alistair Cooke's America Vince Gilligan: Breaking Bad Mark Goodson: Beat the Clock, Card Sharks, Classic Concentration, Family Feud, I've Got a Secret, Match Game, Password, The Price Is Right, Tattletales, To Tell the Truth, What's My Line? Lauren Graham: Gilmore Girls Brad Grey: It's Garry Shandling's Show, The Larry Sanders Show, The Sopranos Merv Griffin: Jeopardy!, Wheel of Fortune Paul Haggis: Due South Alan Hardwick: Yorkshire Television Dan Harmon: Community Don Hewitt: 60 Minutes Stephen Hillenburg: SpongeBob SquarePants Roy Huggins: Baretta, The Fugitive, The Rockford Files Armando Giovanni Iannucci, OBE: The Thick of It, Veep Marta Kauffman: Dream On, Friends, Veronica's Closet, Jesse, Related, Grace and Frankie David E. Kelley: Ally McBeal, Boston Legal, Boston Public, Chicago Hope, Picket Fences, The Practice Michael Patrick King: Sex and the City Eric Kripke: Supernatural, Revolution Matt Kunitz: Fear Factor, Wipeout Verity Lambert: Doctor Who, Adam Adamant Lives!, Jonathan Creek John Langley: COPS Peter Lassally: The Tonight Show Starring Johnny Carson, Late Night With David Letterman, Late Show With David Letterman, The Late Late Show With Craig Ferguson Lynn Marie Latham: Knots Landing, Homefront, The Young and the Restless Bill Lawrence: Scrubs, Cougar Town, Spin City Norman Lear: All in the Family, Good Times, Maude, One Day at a Time, Sanford and Son Ron Leavitt: Married... with Children, Unhappily Ever After Damon Lindelof: Lost, The Leftovers, Watchmen Daniel Lipman: Queer as Folk (US)
 Chuck Lorre: Grace Under Fire, Cybill, Dharma & Greg, Two and a Half Men, The Big Bang Theory, Mike & Molly, Mom Seth MacFarlane: Family Guy, American Dad!, The Cleveland Show David Maloney: Blake's 7, The Day of the Triffids Garry Marshall: The Odd Couple (1970-1975), Happy Days (1974-1984), Laverne & Shirley (1976-1983)
 Quinn Martin: The Untouchables, The Fugitive, The F.B.I., The Invaders, Cannon, The Streets of San Francisco, Barnaby Jones Elizabeth Meriwether: New Girl Lorne Michaels: Saturday Night Live, The Kids in the Hall, 30 Rock Fran Mires: Ocurrio asi, Al Youm Steven Moffat: Doctor Who (after Russell T Davies), Sherlock, Jekyll, Coupling, Joking Apart and Chalk Ronald D. Moore: Battlestar Galactica, Roswell, Star Trek: Deep Space Nine, Star Trek: The Next Generation Sarah Mulvey: Brat Camp, 10 Years Younger, Wife Swap Ryan Murphy: Popular, Nip/Tuck, Glee, American Horror Story , American Horror Stories, The New Normal
 John Nathan-Turner: Doctor Who (1980–1989)
 Mic Neumann: Kung Faux
 Sydney Newman: General Motors Theatre, Armchair Theatre
 Jonathan Nolan: Person of Interest
 Rockne S. O'Bannon: Farscape, Cult
 Michelle Paradise: Exes and Ohs
 Tyler Perry: Meet the Browns, Tyler Perry's House of Payne, For Better or Worse
 William P. Perry: Anyone for Tennyson?
 Julie Plec: The Vampire Diaries
 Bill Podmore: Coronation Street
 Gordon Ramsay: MasterChef US, Kitchen Nightmares, Ramsay's Best Restaurant
 Paul Rauch: Another World (1971-1983), Texas (1980-1981), One Life to Live (1984-1991), Santa Barbara (1992-1993), Guiding Light (1996-2002), The Young and the Restless (2008–2011)
 Shonda Rhimes: Grey's Anatomy, Private Practice, Scandal, How to Get Away with Murder
 Mark Risley: Rugrats, The Wild Thornberrys, Rocket Power and As Told by Ginger
 Gene Roddenberry: Star Trek: The Original Series, Star Trek: The Next Generation
 Shawn Ryan: The Shield, The Chicago Code, Last Resort
 Haim Saban: Power Rangers (1993–2001; 2010–present), Beetleborgs, VR Troopers
 Magnús Scheving: LazyTown
 Dan Schneider: Victorious, iCarly, Drake & Josh, Zoey 101, What I Like About You, Kenan & Kel, The Amanda Show, All That, Cousin Skeeter, Sam & Cat, Henry Danger, Game Shakers, The Adventures of Kid Danger
 Josh Schwartz: The O.C., Chuck, Gossip Girl
 Jerry Seinfeld: Seinfeld
 Tom Selleck: Magnum, P.I.
 Garry Shandling: It's Garry Shandling's Show, The Larry Sanders Show
 David Shore: House, Battle Creek
 David Simon: The Wire, The Corner, Generation Kill, Homicide: Life on the Street, Treme
 Arthur Smith: Hell's Kitchen, American Ninja Warrior, The Titan Games, Mental Samurai
 Aaron Sorkin: Sports Night, The West Wing, Studio 60 on the Sunset Strip, The Newsroom
 Aaron Spelling: Beverly Hills, 90210, Charmed, Charlie's Angels, The Colbys, Dynasty, Family, Fantasy Island, Glitter, Hart to Hart, Hotel, The Love Boat, Love Boat: The Next Wave, Matt Houston, Melrose Place, The Mod Squad, 7th Heaven, Starsky & Hutch, Strike Force, Summerland, Sunset Beach, S.W.A.T., T. J. Hooker, Titans, Vega$,
 Darren Star: Beverly Hills, 90210, Melrose Place, Sex and the City
 Stephen Stohn: Degrassi: The Next Generation, Instant Star
 J. Michael Straczynski: Babylon 5
 Tim Taylor: 13 series of Time Team
 Harry Thomason: Designing Women, Evening Shade, Hearts Afire
 Paul Tibbitt: SpongeBob SquarePants (2007–present)
 Bill Todman: Beat the Clock, Card Sharks, Family Feud, I've Got a Secret, Match Game, Password, The Price Is Right, Tattletales, To Tell the Truth, What's My Line?
 Ivan Tors: Science Fiction Theater, Sea Hunt, The Man and the Challenge, The Aquanauts, Daring Game, Flipper, Gentle Ben, Daktari, Rip Cord, Cowboy in Africa, Jambo
 Mark Wahlberg: In Treatment, Entourage, Boardwalk Empire
 Ray Waru: Frontier of Dreams
 Ken Warwick: American Idol, America's Got Talent, Pop Idol, Gladiators
 Reg Watson: The Young Doctors, Prisoner, Neighbours
 Michael Wearing: Boys from the Blackstuff, Edge of Darkness
 Matthew Weiner: Mad Men
 D. B. Weiss: Game of Thrones'
 Joss Whedon: Buffy the Vampire Slayer, Angel, Firefly and Dollhouse 
 Kevin Williamson: The Vampire Diaries, The Following, Dawson's Creek Andy Wilman: Top Gear and The Grand Tour
 Terence Winter: Boardwalk Empire 
 Dick Wolf: Law & Order, Law & Order: Criminal Intent, Law & Order: Special Victims Unit, Chicago P.D., Chicago Fire, Chicago Med, Chicago Justice 
 J. H. Wyman: Fringe, Almost Human, Keen Eddie

See also
 Film Producer
 Film Director
 Executive Producer
 Line Producer
 Showrunner
 Producers Guild of America
 Writers Guild of America
Screenwriter
Television Director
Television Program Creator

References

External links
Producers Guild of America Frequently Asked Questions

Broadcasting occupations